"Drinking Again" is a 1962 torch song, with lyrics by Johnny Mercer and music by Doris Tauber. The song has been recorded by Frank Sinatra (The World We Knew), Dinah Washington (Drinking Again), Aretha Franklin (Unforgettable: A Tribute to Dinah Washington), Bette Midler (Bette Midler) and James Anthony (Blue Again) among others.

The song was recorded by The Jeff Beck Group in 1968 (with altered lyrics and music) as "I've Been Drinking".

References

Songs with lyrics by Johnny Mercer
Songs about alcohol
Frank Sinatra songs
1962 songs